Reg Fisher (31 August 1932 – 3 June 2011) was  a former Australian rules footballer who played with Richmond and Geelong in the Victorian Football League (VFL).

Notes

External links 		
		
		
		
		
		
		
		
1932 births		
2011 deaths		
Australian rules footballers from Victoria (Australia)		
Richmond Football Club players		
Geelong Football Club players
University Blacks Football Club players